Jūratė is a Lithuanian female  given name.

People named Jūratė include:
Jūratė Kiaupienė (born 1947), Lithuanian historian 
Jūratė Ladavičiūtė (born  1985), Lithuanian freestyle swimmer
Jūratė Trimakaitė (born  1987), Lithuanian puppet director
Jūratė Narvidaite, Lithuanian rower
Jūratė Ščerbinskaitė, Lithuanian swimmer

See also
Jūratė and Kastytis, one of the most famous and popular Lithuanian legends and tales.

Lithuanian feminine given names